John Stocker may refer to:

John Stocker (voice actor)
John Stocker (insurance agent), Philadelphia resident in the 18th century
John Stocker (scientist), Australian immunologist
John Stocker (judge), British judge